The women's pole vault at the 2016 European Athletics Championships took place at the Olympic Stadium on 7 and 9 July.

Records

 During ARAF Suspension

Schedule

Results

Qualification

Qualification: 4.55 m (Q) or best 12 performances (q)

Final

References

Pole Vault W
Pole vault at the European Athletics Championships
2016 in women's athletics